In mathematics, the infinite dihedral group Dih∞ is an infinite group with properties analogous to those of the finite dihedral groups.

In two-dimensional geometry, the infinite dihedral group represents the frieze group symmetry, p1m1, seen as an infinite set of parallel reflections along an axis.

Definition
Every dihedral group is generated by a rotation r and a reflection; if the rotation is a rational multiple of a full rotation, then there is some integer n such that rn is the identity, and we have a finite dihedral group of order 2n. If the rotation is not a rational multiple of a full rotation, then there is no such n and the resulting group has infinitely many elements and is called Dih∞. It has presentations

and is isomorphic to a semidirect product of Z and Z/2, and to the free product Z/2 * Z/2. It is the automorphism group of the graph consisting of a path infinite to both sides. Correspondingly, it is the isometry group of Z (see also symmetry groups in one dimension), the group of permutations α: Z → Z satisfying |i - j| = |α(i) - α(j)|, for all i, j in Z.

The infinite dihedral group can also be defined as the holomorph of the infinite cyclic group.

Aliasing

An example of infinite dihedral symmetry is in aliasing of real-valued signals.  

When sampling a function at frequency  (intervals ), the following functions yield identical sets of samples: }.  Thus, the detected value of frequency  is periodic, which gives the translation element .  The functions and their frequencies are said to be aliases of each other.  Noting the trigonometric identity:

we can write all the alias frequencies as positive values:  .  This gives the reflection element, namely  ↦ .  For example, with   and  ,    reflects to  , resulting in the two left-most black dots in the figure.  The other two dots correspond to   and  .  As the figure depicts, there are reflection symmetries, at 0.5,  ,  1.5,  etc.  Formally, the quotient under aliasing is the orbifold [0, 0.5], with a Z/2 action at the endpoints (the orbifold points), corresponding to reflection.

See also
 The orthogonal group O(2), another infinite generalization of the finite dihedral groups
 The affine symmetric group, a family of groups including the infinite dihedral group

Notes

References

Infinite group theory